Ervin Omić (born 20 January 2003) is an Austrian professional footballer who plays as a defender or a midfielder for Austrian Bundesliga club Wolfsberger AC and the Austrian under-21 national team.

Club career

Early career and Juventus 
Omić started his career with SV Ried in 2011, staying at the club until January 2017, when he joined Red Bull Salzburg's academy, aged 13.

In 2019, Omić moved to Juventus, where he initially played for their Under-16 side. The following season, he was promoted to the Under-17s: upon his return from an injury, he was also given the captain's armband. He ended the 2019–20 season scoring six goals in nine appearances. For the 2020-2021 season, Omić was promoted to the Under-19 side, where he played 25 games without scoring goals. In the 2021–22 season, he made 33 appearances for the Italian side, and helped them reach the UEFA Youth League semifinals, their best-ever placement in the competition.

On 16 March 2022, Omić made his professional debut with Juventus U23 — the reserve team of the Italian club — , coming on as a substitute in the 87th minute of a 2–1 defeat against Lecco.

Wolfsberger AC 
On 18 June 2022, Omić joined the Austrian club Wolfsberger AC on a permanent deal, signing a three-year contract. He played his first match for the club on 9 August 2022, featuring in the UEFA Europa Conference League play-off match against Gżira United, which ended in a 0-4 away win. He subsequently made his Bundesliga debut on 28 August, as he played the entire league match against WSG Tirol, which ended in a 1-3 win for his side.

International career 
Omić is eligible to represent both Austria and Bosnia and Herzegovina at international level.

He has pledged his allegiance to the former country at youth international level, having played for all the youth national setups until the under-21 national team.

In June 2022, he was included in the Austrian Under-19 squad that took part in the UEFA European Under-19 Championship in Slovakia. Here, the team finished third in their group, before eventually losing to the hosts in the FIFA U-20 World Cup play-off.

Style of play 
A right-footed and well-rounded midfielder, Omić can play in several positions through the middle, as well as a centre-back. He has also been regarded for his skills as a penalty and free-kick taker.

He cited Miralem Pjanić as his main role model.

Career statistics

Club

International

References

External links 

 
 
 OEFB Profile
 
 
 
 
 

2003 births
Living people
Footballers from Upper Austria
People from Ried im Innkreis District
Austrian footballers
Austria youth international footballers
Austrian people of Bosnia and Herzegovina descent
FC Red Bull Salzburg players
Juventus F.C. players
Juventus Next Gen players
Wolfsberger AC players
Association football defenders
Association football midfielders
Serie C players
Austrian Football Bundesliga players